The Patterson Railroad is a defunct railroad that existed in Michigan during the early 1870s. The company incorporated on September 21, 1870 and filed articles on October 3 to construct a line between Patterson Mills (now Belding) and Kiddville (defunct; lay to the north-east across the Flat River). The DL&M would later become part of the Pere Marquette Railroad, which also built a line (the Grand Rapids, Belding and Saginaw Railroad) south from Belding.

The Belding–Kidd line continued to exist throughout the 20th century, eventually becoming part of the Greenville–Lowell line operated by the Mid-Michigan Railroad, a RailAmerica company. In December 2007 Mid-Michigan petitioned the Surface Transportation Board to abandon the line. The grade is to be converted to a rail trail.

Notes

References 

Railway companies established in 1870
Railway companies disestablished in 1872
Patterson Railroad
Defunct Michigan railroads
Predecessors of the Pere Marquette Railway